Janis and Saint Christopher (2013) is an urban fantasy e-novel by Australian radio presenter James McKenzie.

Plot summary 

The e-novel is set in Saint Christopher, an Australian city colonised by the French. Rebel journalist Scott Parker gets into a fight at a media conference and the Christian Lobby stages a protest about the morality of homosexuality when they learn about his husband's outdoor sex park. Aging flower power queen Janis Joplin gets sucked into the drama after she performs a concert at the sex park.

Queerd Magazine said it was "a dark comedy that explores confronting issues. Same-sex divorce, infidelity, barebacking, media manipulation and corruption, political scandals, even Botox addiction gets a guernsey."

Janis Joplin 

"I originally intended that Janis would play a cameo in the novel but she wouldn't go away," author James McKenzie told Q News (Australian magazine). "Bringing her to life and exploring what her life would have been like if she hadn't died young was wondrous. She's the book's rock, guiding much younger characters as their lives spin publicly out of control."

Characters 

Scott Parker; Janis Joplin; Mick Sarkozy (gay footballer); Ryan Morris (sex park owner); Susie Toasta (manipulative television reporter); Brian Steally (camera man and Susie's husband); Michael Slider (conservative politician); Veronica Slider; Chez Devers (radio station manager and Janis's love interest); Peter Rattle (gay cop); Jane Ernst (Susie's TV rival); Janette Howard.

Distribution 

Melbourne's Moreland Leader newspaper said leading online book retailers have distributed Janis and Saint Christopher internationally, including Angus and Robertson and Amazon.

References 

 http://www.gaynewsnetwork.com.au/entertainment/entertainment/10772-edge-of-fantasia.html

External links 
 http://www.janisandsaintchristopher.com
 BookBaby eBook publishing and distribution
 [3CR http://www.3cr.org.au/inyaface]

2013 Australian novels
Australian fantasy novels